Adaílton dos Santos da Silva (born 6 December 1990) is a Brazilian footballer who plays as Forward and Winger. He play for FC Tokyo of J1 League.

Club statistics
Updated to the start from 2023 season.

Honours
FC Tokyo
J.League Cup: 2020

References

External links

Profile at Júbilo Iwata

1990 births
Living people
Brazilian footballers
Brazilian expatriate footballers
J1 League players
J2 League players
Campeonato Brasileiro Série A players
Campeonato Brasileiro Série B players
Júbilo Iwata players
Fortaleza Esporte Clube players
Esporte Clube Vitória players
Club Athletico Paranaense players
Ituano FC players
Joinville Esporte Clube players
Associação Atlética Ponte Preta players
Paraná Clube players
FC Tokyo players
People from Camaçari
Association football midfielders
Brazilian expatriate sportspeople in Japan
Expatriate footballers in Japan
Sportspeople from Bahia